{{Infobox professional wrestler
| name        = Ted DiBiase Jr.
| image       = Ted-DiBiase-Jr-T4.jpg
| image_size  = 
| alt         =
| caption     = DiBiase in 2011
| birth_name  = Theodore Marvin DiBiase Jr.| alma_mater  = Mississippi College
| birth_date  = 
| birth_place = Baton Rouge, Louisiana, United States
| resides     = 
| children    = 2
| spouse      = 
| family      = Iron Mike DiBiase (grandfather)Helen Hild (grandmother)Ted DiBiase (father)Mike DiBiase (half-brother)Brett DiBiase (brother)
| names       = Ted DiBiaseTed DiBiase Jr.
| height      = 
| weight      = 
| billed      = Madison, Mississippi
| trainer     = Chris YoungbloodHarley Race's Wrestling Academy
| debut       = July 8, 2006
| retired     = 2017
}}Theodore Marvin DiBiase Jr. (born November 8, 1982) is an American former professional wrestler, best known for his time with WWE as an original member of the stable The Legacy, and for his repackaged gimmick of "The DiBiase Posse", where he threw tailgating parties before, during, and after WWE shows.

Part of the DiBiase wrestling family, he was trained by Chris Youngblood and Harley Race's Wrestling Academy and debuted in 2006. He won the Fusion Pro Tag Team Championship with his brother Mike DiBiase in February 2007, and also toured Japan with Pro Wrestling Noah. He signed a developmental contract with WWE in July 2007, and was assigned to their developmental facility, Florida Championship Wrestling (FCW), where he won the FCW Southern Heavyweight Championship in December 2007. Due to injury, he relinquished the championship in January 2008. He made his WWE television debut on May 26, 2008, and quickly formed a tag team with Cody Rhodes. The duo won the World Tag Team Championship twice before forming The Legacy faction alongside Randy Orton. Following The Legacy's dissolution, DiBiase moved into singles competition and received the Million Dollar Championship from his father Ted DiBiase.

DiBiase left WWE in 2013 due to family commitments and other business pursuits. He continued to wrestle on the independent circuit until his retirement in 2017.

Early life
DiBiase was born on November 8, 1982 in Baton Rouge, Louisiana, and was raised in Clinton, Mississippi. He knew fellow professional wrestler Christie Ricci as a child, as they attended a Sunday school class together. He graduated from Clinton High School in 2001. At Clinton, DiBiase was the football team's starting quarterback. He enrolled at Mississippi College in Clinton and was a starting wide receiver for Mississippi College's football team before leaving the squad following his freshman season. He also played soccer in college, and received awards in both sports. He graduated in 2005 with a Bachelor of Science and Bachelor of Business Administration. During his time in college, DiBiase considered becoming a minister.

Professional wrestling career

Early career (2006–2007)
DiBiase and his older brother Mike DiBiase, received professional wrestling training from Chris Youngblood in Amarillo, Texas, before going to train at Harley Race's Wrestling Academy. The DiBiase brothers made their professional wrestling debut on July 8, 2006 for World League Wrestling (WLW), the promotion run by Harley Race in Eldon, Missouri in conjunction with the Wrestling Academy. On February 17, 2007, they won the Fusion Pro Tag Team Championship by defeating Raheem Rashaad and Juntsi. In early 2007, DiBiase also wrestled on tours in Japan for Pro Wrestling Noah, where he competed against wrestlers including the former GHC Junior Heavyweight Champion, KENTA.

World Wrestling Entertainment / WWE

Florida Championship Wrestling (2007–2008)

In July 2007, DiBiase signed a developmental deal with World Wrestling Entertainment (WWE) and debuted in their training territory Florida Championship Wrestling (FCW). He made his FCW debut on August 4 in a tag team match, in which he and Jake Hager defeated Keith Walker and Heath Miller. In October, DiBiase became a member of the Next Generation Hart Foundation faction alongside Harry Smith, TJ Wilson, Nattie Neidhart, and Teddy Hart. He quickly separated from the group, however, and gained Maryse as a valet. On December 18, 2007, DiBiase defeated TJ Wilson to win the FCW Southern Heavyweight Championship in New Port Richey, Florida. DiBiase, however, was unable to defend it due to an injury sustained, so he awarded the championship to his partner Heath Miller on January 19, 2008. As of March 2008, DiBiase had suffered from a multitude of injuries including sciatica, a fractured left knee, separated ribs, broken finger, and bone spurs in his elbow. Due to these injuries, DiBiase competed sporadically in FCW for the next few months, competing in both tag team and singles competition.

The Legacy (2008–2010)

DiBiase made his WWE television debut as a villain on May 26, 2008, where he cut a promo about his intent to become a champion like his father, Ted DiBiase Sr., challenging the World Tag Team Champions, Cody Rhodes and Hardcore Holly. At the Night of Champions pay-per-view, DiBiase won the World Tag Team Championship in his first match in WWE, after Rhodes betrayed Holly, revealing himself to be DiBiase's partner. After holding the title for just over a month, they dropped it to John Cena and Batista on the August 4 episode of Raw. The following week, DiBiase and Rhodes used their rematch clause to regain the title.

DiBiase and Rhodes were soon joined by Manu, forming a stable of multi-generation superstars. On the October 27 episode of Raw, DiBiase and Rhodes lost their title to CM Punk and Kofi Kingston. It was during this time that Randy Orton became linked to Rhodes, DiBiase, and Manu on television, criticizing them in a mentor-type role. On the November 3 episode of Raw, DiBiase was attacked by Orton, after he interfered in Orton's match. This storyline attack was to allow DiBiase to be written out of WWE storylines, so he could film the direct-to-video movie, The Marine 2.

On the January 12, 2009, episode of Raw, DiBiase returned to aid Manu and Sim Snuka in attacking Cody Rhodes and Randy Orton. Instead, however, DiBiase turned on them and helped Rhodes and Orton assault Manu and Snuka, thus joining The Legacy faction. As part of The Legacy, DiBiase entered the Royal Rumble match in order to help Orton win, and lasted until the final four, before being eliminated by Triple H. Rhodes and DiBiase became involved in Orton's scripted rivalry with the McMahon family, helping him to attack Shane and Stephanie McMahon, and Stephanie's real-life husband, Triple H. DiBiase was also elevated to main event status as a result of joining The Legacy, competing in handicap and six-man tag team matches, as well as the occasional singles match against Orton's opponents and rivals. On April 26, at the Backlash pay-per-view, DiBiase, Rhodes, and Orton defeated Triple H, Batista, and Shane McMahon in a six-man tag team match, which, per the pre-match stipulation, resulted in Orton winning the WWE Championship. During WWE's tour of Australia in early July, DiBiase suffered an arm injury, but did not miss any time because of it. Throughout mid-2009, DiBiase and Rhodes continued to compete against and attack Orton's rivals, particularly Triple H, preventing him from earning a match for Orton's championship. As a result, Triple H reformed D-Generation X (DX) with Shawn Michaels and they defeated DiBiase and Rhodes at SummerSlam. DiBiase and Rhodes later defeated DX in a submissions count anywhere match at the Breaking Point pay-per-view, before losing to DX in a Hell in a Cell match at the Hell in a Cell pay-per-view in October.

Tension between the members of The Legacy began building in 2010, when Orton attacked DiBiase and Rhodes for accidentally costing him a chance to win the WWE Championship at the Royal Rumble pay-per-view. In February 2010, DiBiase defeated Mark Henry in an Elimination Chamber qualifying match, earning a chance to win the WWE Championship. At the Elimination Chamber pay-per-view, he eliminated Orton from the Elimination Chamber match, but was eliminated by Kofi Kingston soon after. On the February 22 episode of Raw, Orton turned on The Legacy, believing they had a plan to turn on him, and in retaliation, they attacked Orton the following week. As a result, the three competed in a triple threat match at WrestleMania XXVI in which Orton defeated Rhodes and DiBiase.

Million Dollar Champion (2010–2011)

After WrestleMania, DiBiase debuted a new gimmick of an arrogant millionaire, similar to his father's old gimmick. On the April 5 episode of Raw, DiBiase was given possession of the Million Dollar Championship and access to a trust fund by his father. DiBiase then began looking for a "Virgil", a manservant like his father used to have. He offered the position to R-Truth, who refused, provoking a feud between the two. On the May 17 episode of Raw, DiBiase revealed his "Virgil"—the original Virgil who had worked for his father. In his first singles pay-per-view match at Over the Limit, DiBiase was defeated by R-Truth. During the match, DiBiase suffered a concussion, but was able to appear on Raw the following night. On the June 21 episode of Raw, DiBiase fired Virgil in favor of the managerial services of his on-screen girlfriend Maryse. In September 2010, DiBiase entered in a feud with Goldust over the Million Dollar Championship, after Goldust stole the title from him. On the November 15 episode of Raw, Goldust returned the Million Dollar Championship belt to DiBiase Sr., who then offered to give it back to his son, but he refused the offer, proclaiming that he was interested in another belt. Later in the night DiBiase attacked WWE United States Champion Daniel Bryan, setting up a match at Survivor Series for the championship, in which he was unsuccessful. DiBiase was a Pro for the fourth season of NXT, in which he and Maryse mentored Brodus Clay. On the January 25, 2011, episode of NXT, Clay traded DiBiase for Alberto Del Rio as his Pro.

As part of the 2011 supplemental draft on April 26, DiBiase was drafted to the SmackDown brand. In his first match on SmackDown, DiBiase lost to his former tag team partner Cody Rhodes. The following week, DiBiase was accompanied to the ring by Rhodes. On the June 3 episode of SmackDown, DiBiase lost to former rival, Daniel Bryan via submission. After the match, Rhodes and DiBiase attacked Bryan, but were stopped by Sin Cara. On the July 8 episode of SmackDown, DiBiase teamed with Rhodes in a winning effort against the team of Bryan and Ezekiel Jackson. After DiBiase lost a match against Randy Orton on the August 26 episode of SmackDown, Rhodes attacked him, ending their association.

The DiBiase Posse (2011–2013)

On the September 16 episode of SmackDown, as Rhodes was ridiculing the audience, DiBiase disguised himself as a fan by wearing a paper bag on his head before attacking Rhodes, turning into a fan favorite. DiBiase then challenged Rhodes for the WWE Intercontinental Championship at Night of Champions, but was unsuccessful. In a YouTube video published on September 22, DiBiase introduced his new gimmick to hold tailgating parties with fans just before WWE events, terming those who tailgated with him as the "DiBiase Posse"; DiBiase also acknowledged that mimicking his father's rich gimmick "didn't really work out".

In November 2011, Jinder Mahal chastised DiBiase about forsaking his wealthy upbringing to hang out with commoners, starting a feud and leading to DiBiase defeating Mahal on the December 9 episode of SmackDown. Three weeks later, Mahal defeated DiBiase to conclude the feud. In January 2012, Hunico started a feud with DiBiase when Hunico was offended that he was not invited to one of DiBiase's Posse parties. Both traded victories in regular singles matches on SmackDown, with DiBiase wrestling despite a wrist injury. Although DiBiase beat Hunico in a flag match, Hunico cheated to win the last match in the series in February. On March 6, DiBiase suffered a broken ankle during television tapings. That same month, DiBiase announced that he was undergoing shoulder surgery. DiBiase returned on September 16 at Night of Champions, participating in the pre-show WWE United States Championship number one contender battle royal, but was eliminated by Tensai. DiBiase's only televised match in 2013 saw him defeat Michael McGillicutty on the May 9 episode of Superstars. On August 26, after suffering from depression and anxiety, DiBiase announced that he was not renewing his WWE contract, which expired on September 1.

Independent circuit (2013–2017)
DiBiase made his first wrestling appearance since leaving WWE on October 12, 2013, in the opening round of Family Wrestling Entertainment's Grand Prix tournament, defeating Colt Cabana. On October 18, 2013, DiBiase was announced to appear at Tommy Dreamer's House of Hardcore 3. At the event, he participated in a pre-show meet and greet. After that, he did not wrestle again until he had two matches for Mississippi-based promotion Pro Wrestling EGO in 2016 and 2017.

Charity and business
In May 2012, DiBiase started his own non-profit organization, the Ted DiBiase Foundation. As part of the foundation, individuals with life-threatening illnesses or disabilities were offered the chance to meet DiBiase at WWE live events, and further programs for youth leadership and community causes are being developed. He also participates in programs as a leader for the Heart of David Ministry.

When DiBiase left WWE, he took up an executive position with CollegeGarageSale.com, a college textbook e-commerce website. He is now the vice president of business development for One Life.

Other media

In late 2008, DiBiase began filming the movie The Marine 2, in which he plays the main character, Joe Linwood. The Marine 2 is a direct-to-DVD-and-Blu-ray project, and was released on December 29, 2009. The film was DiBiase's first acting experience, and he spent six weeks in Thailand for filming. For the movie, DiBiase performed all his own stunts, which resulted in him separating the cartilage between two of his ribs during a fight scene.

On August 26, 2009, DiBiase appeared on the late-night talk show The Tonight Show with Conan O'Brien along with Cody Rhodes, The Great Khali, and Big Show. He has his own YouTube show, The DiBiase Posse, which focuses on his life outside of the ring.

Personal life
DiBiase is a third-generation professional wrestler. His grandfather Iron Mike DiBiase, his grandmother Helen Hild and his father "The Million Dollar Man" Ted DiBiase are professional wrestlers. His older half-brother Mike and his younger full brother Brett are also former professional wrestlers. On March 27, 2010, DiBiase and his brother Brett inducted their father into the WWE Hall of Fame.

DiBiase married his high school sweetheart, Kristen, a nurse, on October 30, 2008. DiBiase and his wife have a son, who was born in 2012, and a daughter.

On February 15, 2008, DiBiase was arrested for DUI in Hillsborough County, Florida, after his Cadillac sport utility vehicle crashed into another vehicle. No one was seriously injured in the crash, but DiBiase failed a field sobriety test, and when breathalysed, was found to have a blood alcohol level of 0.137–0.138. He was released later that day on a $500.00 (US Dollar) bail bond.

Mississippi welfare funds scandal

In May 2022, the Mississippi Department of Human Services sued DiBiase, his father and brother, retired NFL quarterback Brett Favre, and several others to recover more than $20 million in money "squandered" from the Temporary Assistance for Needy Families anti-poverty program. He was also found to have played a major role in benefiting from speaking engagements which aided the controversy, with his companies Priceless Ventures LLC and Familiae Orientem receiving more than $3 million from nonprofit groups between 2017 and 2019.

Championships and accomplishmentsFlorida Championship WrestlingFCW Southern Heavyweight Championship (1 time)Fusion Pro WrestlingFusion Pro Tag Team Championship (1 time) – with Mike DiBiase IIPro Wrestling IllustratedRanked No. 34 of the best 500 singles wrestlers in the PWI 500 in 2010World Wrestling Entertainment'''
Million Dollar Championship (1 time)
World Tag Team Championship (2 times) – with Cody Rhodes

References

External links

1982 births
American male film actors
American male professional wrestlers
Living people
Million Dollar Champions
Mississippi College Choctaws football players
People from Clinton, Mississippi
Professional wrestlers from Louisiana
The Hart Foundation members
21st-century professional wrestlers
FCW Southern Heavyweight Champions